UAAP Season 66 is the 2003−04 athletic year of the University Athletic Association of the Philippines, which was hosted by the Ateneo de Manila University. The season opened on July 12, 2003

Basketball

Elimination round

Bracket

Overall championship race

Juniors' division

Seniors' division

Individual Awards
Athletes of the Year: 
 Men: 
 Women: 
 Boys: 
 Girls:

Broadcast notes
From that year, the UAAP still broadcast on Studio 23 for the third consecutive year production of ABS-CBN Sports. The following broadcasters are Jude Turcuato (final year of his lead play-by-play in the UAAP) and Boom Gonzalez is the currently become main presenter and the commentators Randy Sacdalan, Ryan Gregorio and Ronnie Magsanoc.

After the telecast of the UAAP, the broadcast brought the Philippine Basketball League was the first telecast on Studio 23 that remain until 2007.

See also
NCAA Season 79

External links
UAAP unveils season 66
WebArchive - www.uaapgames.com, as of March 24, 2004
UST sweeps UAAP overall title. (March 6, 2004)
UBelt.com - UAAP Season 66 - Final Overall Championship Tally

 
2003 in Philippine sport
66